Neovossia is a genus of fungi in the Tilletiaceae family. The genus was first described by German botanist Friedrich August Körnicke in 1879.

References

External links
Neovossia at Index Fungorum

Ustilaginomycotina
Taxa named by Friedrich August Körnicke